"Angel on My Shoulder" is a song written and recorded by Shelby Flint for her self-titled debut album in 1960. The single reached No. 22 on the US Billboard Hot 100 singles chart in early 1961. It was Flint's only Top 40 hit.

Other versions
Jerry Wallace (1960)
Kathy Young (1961)
Jimmy Young (1961)
 Pat Boone released his cover on the album Moody River (1961)
The Cascades released a version of the song on their 1963 album, Rhythm of the Rain.
Gary Martin with The Blockbusters (1964)
Merrilee Rush charted with her rendition in 1970, reaching #122 (US).
Joni Lee, daughter of Conway Twitty, hit #42 on the Billboard Country Singles chart, 1976.
Maureen McGovern (1992)

References

1960 songs
1960 singles
Valiant Records singles
The Cascades (band) songs
Songs written by Shelby Flint